Vigonza is a comune (municipality) in the Province of Padua in the Italian region Veneto, located about  west of Venice and about  northeast of Padua.

The municipality of Vigonza contains the frazioni (subdivisions, mainly villages and hamlets) Busa, Codiverno, Peraga, Perarolo, Pionca, San Vito. Località: Codivernarolo, Battana Prati, Capriccio, Luganega, Barbariga, Carpane, Bagnoli, and Santa Maria.

Vigonza borders the following municipalities: Cadoneghe, Campodarsego, Fiesso d'Artico, Noventa Padovana, Padua, Pianiga, Stra, Villanova di Camposampiero.

Demographic evolution

References

External links
 www.comune.vigonza.pd.it/

Cities and towns in Veneto